The Pearce–McAllister Cottage is a former historic house museum in the City Park West neighborhood of northeast Denver, Colorado, United States. It is administered by History Colorado (the Colorado Historical Society).

The cottage was built in 1899 in the Dutch Colonial Revival style. The Denver-based architect Frederick Sterner built the house for Harold V. Pearce and his wife, Cara Rowena Bell Pearce. The second owners, the McAllisters, remodeled the interior in the 1920s and this is how the cottage is now presented.

The Pearce–McAllister Cottage was home to the Denver Museum of Miniatures, Dolls and Toys until 2018. The collection includes more than 20,000 objects from 1680 onwards.

The house was listed on the US National Register of Historic Places in 1972.

See also 
 National Register of Historic Places listings in Northeast Denver, Colorado

References

External links 
 Pearce–McAllister Cottage History Colorado
 Denver Museum of Miniatures, Dolls and Toys

Houses completed in 1899
Historic house museums in Colorado
Museums in Denver
National Register of Historic Places in Denver
Dutch Colonial Revival architecture in the United States
Houses on the National Register of Historic Places in Colorado
Houses in Denver